The Sustained Spheromak Physics Experiment (SSPX) is a program at Lawrence Livermore National Laboratory in the United States established to investigate spheromak plasma.

A spheromak device produces a plasma in magnetohydrodynamic equilibrium mainly through self-induced plasma currents, as opposed to a tokamak device which depends on large externally generated magnetic fields. The series of experiments examines the potential for a spheromak device to contain fusion fuel. According to a 1999 abstract,
The Sustained Spheromak Physics Experiment, SSPX , will study spheromak physics with particular attention to energy confinement  and magnetic fluctuations in a spheromak sustained by electrostatic helicity injection.

See also
Magnetohydrodynamics
Magnetic helicity
Magnetic reconnection
Turbulence

References

External links
Science@Livermore - Press release
Fusion Energy Program publications

Romero-Talamas, Investigations of Spheromak plasma dynamics, Ph.D. thesis
Selected abstracts:
Romero-Talamas, Spheromak formation and sustainment studies
Wang, Large-amplitude electron density
Hooper, Sustained Spheromak Physics Experiment

Lawrence Livermore National Laboratory
Magnetic confinement fusion devices